Drivetime is an Irish news and current affairs radio programme broadcast by RTÉ Radio 1 on Mondays to Fridays between 16.30 and 19.00. It attracts approximately 265,000 listeners daily.

The programme is co-presented by journalists Sarah McInerney and Cormac Ó hEadhra. It includes news summaries, sports news, and traffic and weather reports as well as live interviews and reports. Fergal Keane is one of Drivetime'''s principal reporters. Other writers and journalists who contribute to the programme include Joseph O'Connor, Olivia O'Leary, and Fergus Finlay. Special extended editions of Drivetime'' are mounted from time to time to cover such major news stories as general elections and referendums.

See also
 Morning Ireland

References

External links
  RTÉ News Page
  RTÉ Radio Drivetime Page
  RTÉ Radio Drivetime Sport Page

Irish talk radio shows
RTÉ News and Current Affairs
RTÉ Radio 1 programmes